Crawford is a 2008 documentary film about Crawford, Texas, and the impact of President George W. Bush having relocated to the town shortly after announcing his nomination for the 2000 presidential election. The film spans nearly the entirety of Bush's presidency, from 1999 to mid-2008. Crawford was directed by David Modigliani and distributed by B-Side Entertainment.

On October 7, 2008, the complete film was made available for free on the video website Hulu and was billed as the site's "first movie premiere."

Reviews
On Rotten Tomatoes the film has an approval rating of 100% based on reviews from 5 critics.

It won the 2008 San Antonio Film Festival Auteur Award. It also won the Austin Award at the Austin Film Critics Association Awards 2008.

References

External links
 
 Official website

2008 films
Films about George W. Bush
McLennan County, Texas
Universal Pictures films
American documentary films
2008 documentary films
Films shot in Texas
Documentary films about American politicians
2000s English-language films
2000s American films
English-language documentary films